
Gmina Parysów is a rural gmina (administrative district) in Garwolin County, Masovian Voivodeship, in east-central Poland.

Villages
Gmina Parysów contains the villages and settlements of Choiny, Górki-Kolonia, Kozłów, Łukowiec, Parysów, Poschła, Słup, Starowola, Stodzew, Wola Starogrodzka and Żabieniec.

Neighbouring gminas
Gmina Parysów is bordered by the gminas of Borowie, Garwolin, Latowicz, Pilawa and Siennica.

References
Polish official population figures 2006

Parysow
Garwolin County